Venezuela competed at the 2018 Summer Youth Olympics, in Buenos Aires, Argentina from 6 to 18 October 2018.

Basketball 3x3

Venezuela qualified both teams (8 athletes) via World Ranking as of April 1, 2018 (1st in Boys; 4th in Girls). This is a 2nd qualification in a row for a Venezuelan 3x3 (also qualified in Nanjing 2014 both teams). This is not consider as Team Sport (all athletes have individual World Ranking).

Beach Handball

Venezuela qualified Boys' Team and Girls' Team (18 athletes) to the tournament.

Beach volleyball

Veneuzuela qualified girls' and boys' from their performance at the 2018 CSV Youth Beach volleyball Tour.

Boxing

Boys

Cycling

Venezuela qualified one athlete in BMX freestyle based on its performance at the 2018 Urban Cycling World Championship.

 Mixed BMX freestyle - 1 girl

Equestrian

Venezuela qualified a rider based on its ranking in the FEI World Jumping Challenge Rankings.

Fencing

Venezuela qualified one athlete based on its performance at the 2018 Cadet World Championship.

 Girls' Foil - Anabella Acurero Gonzalez

Gymnastics

Artistic
Venezuela qualified one gymnast based on its performance at the 2018 American Junior Championship.

 Boys' artistic individual all-around - 1 quota

Multidiscipline

Judo

Modern pentathlon

Venezuela qualified one pentathlete based on its performance at the Pan American Youth Olympic Games Qualifier.

Sailing

Venezuela qualified one boat based on its performance at the Central and South American IKA Twin Tip Qualifiers.

 Girls' IKA Twin Tip Racing - 1 boat

Triathlon

Venezuela qualified one athlete based on its performance at the 2018 American Youth Olympic Games Qualifier.

Individual

Relay

Weightlifting

Venezuela qualified one quota in the boys' events and one quota in the girls' events based on the team ranking after the 2017 Weightlifting Youth World Championships.

Boy

Girl

Wrestling

Key:
  – Victory by Fall
  – Without any points scored by the opponent
  – With point(s) scored by the opponent
  – Without any points scored by the opponent
  – With point(s) scored by the opponent

References

2018 in Venezuelan sport
Nations at the 2018 Summer Youth Olympics
Venezuela at the Youth Olympics